is a type of Japanese pottery traditionally made in Matsuyama, Ehime prefecture.

A little red-clawed crab (赤手蟹 akategani) peeking out of the sides of the vessel is the trademark.

References

External links 
 http://otokuinfomation.web.fc2.com/blog/index5675.html

Culture in Ehime Prefecture
Japanese pottery